Hannan Crystal (born 15 January 1938) is an Israeli former sports shooter. He competed at the 1960 Summer Olympics and the 1964 Summer Olympics.

References

1938 births
Living people
Israeli male sport shooters
Olympic shooters of Israel
Shooters at the 1960 Summer Olympics
Shooters at the 1964 Summer Olympics
Sportspeople from Tel Aviv